Edmund Joseph Cooray, CMG, OBE (November 3, 1915 - January 1, 2016) was a Ceylonese Senator and one time Minister of Justice in the Second Dudley Senanayake cabinet. He attended the 1960 Commonwealth Prime Ministers' Conference in London on behalf of the Dominion of Ceylon.

He having graduated with a BA from the University of London, he qualified as a barrister and established his legal practice as an advocate. He was a lecturer for digest and voet at the Ceylon Law College. He served as the Commissioner of Co-operative Development and thereafter Chairman, Co-operative Wholesale Establishment. He was appointed an Officer of the Order of the British Empire (OBE) in the 1952 Birthday Honours and a Companion of the Order of St Michael and St George (CMG) in the 1955 Birthday Honours for his services to the co-operative movement.

References

Justice ministers of Sri Lanka
Members of the Senate of Ceylon
Ceylonese Officers of the Order of the British Empire
Ceylonese Companions of the Order of St Michael and St George
Alumni of the University of London
Academic staff of Sri Lanka Law College
Ceylonese advocates
Sri Lankan barristers
Sinhalese lawyers